Carl Heinrich (1880 New York City – 1955) was an American entomologist.

Life 
He studied Greek and drama at the University of Chicago, he moved to Washington D.C., in 1902, where he worked in business. In 1908, he went to New York to study music. Heinrich moved back to Washington and in 1913 joined the United States Department of Agriculture. He initially worked on applied entomology but later switched to specialise in the study of Lepidoptera.

He was editor of the Proceedings of the Entomological Society of Washington from 1924 to 1926.

References 

 SIRIS - Smithsonian Institution Research Information System
 Butterflies and Moths of the World  - Genera authored by Carl Heinrich

American lepidopterists

1880 births
1955 deaths
American taxonomists
University of Chicago alumni
20th-century American zoologists